Max Q is the first and only studio album by Australian band Max Q. The album was released in September 1989. It was certified gold in Australia.

At the ARIA Music Awards of 1990, the album was nominated for ARIA Award for Breakthrough Artist – Album.

Reception

Dan Jones said "Max Q deserves some long overdue attention. Constructed around Olsen's hybrid electronic song structures, Max Q explodes with invention at every turn. 'Sometimes' and 'Way of the World' bristle with a vibe of punk/agro meets disco/house splendor – an area bands like Depeche Mode and Massive Attack have explored in depth. Jittery guitars clash with looped percussion attacks, and Michael's raging vocal workouts head butt powerful orchestral flourishes and the odd sonic bleep. There's a lot of raw noise going on here, but some of it is certainly beautiful".

Track listing

Personnel 

Max Q members
 Michael Hutchence – vocals
 Ollie Olsen – producer
 Arne Hanna – guitar
 Michael Sheridan – guitar, feedback
 Bill McDonald – bass guitar
 Gus Till – piano, MIDI programming
 John Murphy – drums, percussion, trumpet, screams

Additional personnel
 Peggy Harley – backing vocals
 Marie Hoy – backing vocals ("Soul Engine")
 Pat Powell – backing vocals ("Bucket Head")
 Pam Ross – narration
 Paula Jones – engineer

Charts

Weekly charts

Year-end charts

Certification

Release history

References

1989 debut albums
Max Q (Australian band) albums
Albums produced by Michael Hutchence
Albums produced by Ollie Olsen
Mercury Records soundtracks